The 2010–11 Denver Nuggets season was the 44th season of the franchise, its 35th in the National Basketball Association (NBA). After half a season of rumors and speculation, the Nuggets granted Carmelo Anthony his wish by trading him to the New York Knicks on February 21 as part of a three-team trade with the Minnesota Timberwolves. The blockbuster trade also sent Chauncey Billups, Anthony Carter, Renaldo Balkman, Shelden Williams, and Corey Brewer to the Knicks for Wilson Chandler, Danilo Gallinari, Raymond Felton, Timofey Mozgov, Kosta Koufos, New York's first round pick in the 2014 draft and Golden State's second round picks in 2012 and 2013. Minnesota received Denver's 2015 second round pick, Eddy Curry and Anthony Randolph.

After the trade, Nuggets coach George Karl said, "I'm glad its over. I'm glad it's an opportunity to reinvent", expressing relief at the end of the months of speculation preceding the trade.

Key dates
 June 24 – The 2010 NBA draft took place in New York City.
 July 1 – The free agency period begun.

Summary

NBA Draft 2010

Free agency
This free agency period, the Nuggets signed Al Harrington & Shelden Williams

Draft picks

Roster

Pre-season

Game log

|- bgcolor="#ccffcc"
| 1
| October 8
| Portland
| 
| Carmelo Anthony (24)
| Shelden Williams (14)
| Ty Lawson (6)
| Pepsi Center10,864
| 1–0
|- bgcolor="#ffcccc"
| 2
| October 12
| @ Minnesota
| 
| Arron Afflalo (20)
| Shelden Williams (8)
| Ty Lawson (6)
| Target Center8,718
| 1–1
|- bgcolor="#ccffcc"
| 3
| October 14
| @ L.A. Clippers
| 
| Carmelo Anthony (30)
| Carmelo Anthony (14)
| Carmelo Anthony (9)
| Staples Center10,572
| 2–1
|- bgcolor="#ffcccc"
| 4
| October 16
| @ L.A. Lakers
| 
| Arron Afflalo (20)
| Renaldo Balkman (10)
| Ty Lawson (7)
| Staples Center16,304
| 2–2
|- bgcolor="#ccffcc"
| 5
| October 17
| @ L.A. Clippers
| 
| J. R. Smith (24)
| Eric Boateng (10)
| Ty Lawson (7)
| Staples Centern/a
| 3–2
|- bgcolor="#ccffcc"
| 6
| October 19
| Oklahoma City
| 
| Arron Afflalo (22)
| Carmelo Anthony (9)
| Chauncey Billups (8)
| Pepsi Center13,549
| 4–2
|- bgcolor="#ffcccc"
| 7
| October 21
| @ Portland
| 
| Carmelo Anthony (21)
| Carmelo Anthony,Melvin Ely (7)
| Ty Lawson (7)
| Rose Garden19,710
| 4–3
|- bgcolor="#ccffcc"
| 8
| October 22
| @ Phoenix
| 
| Ty Lawson (29)
| Arron Afflalo (9)
| Arron Afflalo (10)
| US Airways Center15,440
| 5–3
|-

Regular season

Standings

Record vs. opponents

Game log

|- bgcolor="#ccffcc"
| 1
| October 27
| Utah
| 
| Carmelo Anthony (23)
| Shelden Williams (16)
| Chauncey Billups (8)
| Pepsi Center19,155
| 1–0
|- bgcolor="#ffcccc"
| 2
| October 29    
| @ New Orleans
| 
| Carmelo Anthony (24)
| Shelden Williams (13)
| Chauncey Billups (5)
| New Orleans Arena12,474
| 1–1
|- bgcolor="#ccffcc"
| 3
| October 30
| @ Houston
| 
| Al Harrington (28)
| Nenê (12)
| Carmelo Anthony (4)
| Toyota Center18,161
| 2–1
|-

|- bgcolor="#ffcccc"
| 4
| November 3
| Dallas
| 
| Carmelo Anthony (20)
| Carmelo Anthony (15)
| Ty Lawson (9)
| Pepsi Center14,159
| 2–2
|- bgcolor="#ccffcc"
| 5
| November 5
| L.A. Clippers
| 
| Carmelo Anthony (30)
| Melvin Ely,Al Harrington (8)
| Chauncey Billups (7)
| Pepsi Center15,559
| 3–2
|- bgcolor="#ccffcc"
| 6
| November 6
| @ Dallas
| 
| Carmelo Anthony (27)
| Al Harrington (8)
| Ty Lawson,J. R. Smith (5)
| American Airlines Center19,948
| 4–2
|- bgcolor="#ffcccc"
| 7
| November 8
| @ Chicago
| 
| Carmelo Anthony (32)
| Carmelo Anthony (8)
| Chauncey Billups (4)
| United Center21,355
| 4–3
|- bgcolor="#ffcccc"
| 8
| November 9
| @ Indiana
| 
| Ty Lawson (19)
| Nenê (6)
| Arron Afflalo,J. R. Smith (4)
| Conseco Fieldhouse11,122
| 4–4
|- bgcolor="#ccffcc"
| 9
| November 11
| L.A. Lakers
| 
| Carmelo Anthony (32)
| Carmelo Anthony (13)
| Ty Lawson (5)
| Pepsi Center19,155
| 5–4
|- bgcolor="#ffcccc"
| 10
| November 15
| @ Phoenix
| 
| Carmelo Anthony (20)
| Carmelo Anthony (22)
| Al Harrington (4)
| US Airways Center17,744
| 5–5
|- bgcolor="#ccffcc"
| 11
| November 16
| New York
| 
| Carmelo Anthony (26)
| Carmelo Anthony,Gary Forbes (9)
| Chauncey Billups (8)
| Pepsi Center15,190
| 6–5
|- bgcolor="#ffcccc"
| 12
| November 18
| @ Portland
| 
| Carmelo Anthony (18)
| Arron Afflalo (11)
| Chauncey Billups,Ty Lawson (5)
| Rose Garden20,532
| 6–6
|- bgcolor="#ccffcc"
| 13
| November 20
| New Jersey
| 
| Carmelo Anthony (28)
| Carmelo Anthony,Nenê (8)
| Chauncey Billups (7)
| Pepsi Center16,396
| 7–6
|- bgcolor="#ccffcc"
| 14
| November 22
| @ Golden State
| 
| Carmelo Anthony (39)
| Carmelo Anthony,Al Harrington,Nenê (9)
| Carmelo Anthony,Ty Lawson (5)
| Oracle Arena18,023
| 8–6
|- bgcolor="#ccffcc"
| 15
| November 26
| Chicago
| 
| Carmelo Anthony (22)
| J. R. Smith (9)
| Carmelo Anthony (8)
| Pepsi Center19,155
| 9–6
|- bgcolor="#ccffcc"
| 16
| November 28
| Phoenix
| 
| J. R. Smith (30)
| Nenê (9)
| Chauncey Billups (8)
| Pepsi Center15,482
| 10–6
|-

|- bgcolor="#ccffcc"
| 17
| December 1
| Milwaukee
| 
| Nenê (24)
| J. R. Smith (10)
| Chauncey Billups (9)
| Pepsi Center14,221
| 11–6
|- bgcolor="#ccffcc"
| 18
| December 3
| L.A. Clippers
| 
| Carmelo Anthony (26)
| Nenê (7)
| Chauncey Billups (5)
| Pepsi Center15,829
| 12–6
|- bgcolor="#ccffcc"
| 19
| December 5
| Memphis
| 
| Nenê (27)
| Nenê (11)
| Ty Lawson,Nenê (6)
| Pepsi Center15,017
| 13–6
|- bgcolor="#ffcccc"
| 20
| December 7
| @ Charlotte
| 
| Chauncey Billups (25)
| Carmelo Anthony (7)
| Chauncey Billups,Ty Lawson (5)
| Time Warner Cable Arena15,737
| 13–7
|- bgcolor="#ffcccc"
| 21
| December 8
| @ Boston
| 
| Ty Lawson (24)
| Al Harrington (8)
| Chauncey Billups,Ty Lawson (7)
| TD Garden18,624
| 13–8
|- bgcolor="#ccffcc"
| 22
| December 10
| @ Toronto
| 
| Al Harrington (31)
| Shelden Williams (7)
| Chauncey Billups (8)
| Air Canada Centre14,715
| 14–8
|- bgcolor="#ffcccc"
| 23
| December 12
| @ New York
| 
| Carmelo Anthony (31)
| Carmelo Anthony (13)
| Chauncey Billups (6)
| Madison Square Garden19,387
| 14–9
|- bgcolor="#ccffcc"
| 24
| December 14
| Orlando
| 
| Carmelo Anthony (35)
| Carmelo Anthony (11)
| Ty Lawson (6)
| Pepsi Center16,247
| 15–9
|- bgcolor="#ffcccc"
| 25
| December 16
| San Antonio
| 
| Carmelo Anthony (31)
| Carmelo Anthony (9)
| Ty Lawson (7)
| Pepsi Center16,190
| 15–10
|- bgcolor="#ccffcc"
| 26
| December 18
| Minnesota
| 
| Carmelo Anthony (24)
| Carmelo Anthony (7)
| Ty Lawson (9)
| Pepsi Center15,409
| 16–10
|- bgcolor="#ffcccc"
| 27
| December 22
| @ San Antonio
| 
| Ty Lawson,J. R. Smith (22)
| Arron Afflalo (10)
| Chauncey Billups (7)
| AT&T Center18,581
| 16–11
|- bgcolor="#ffcccc"
| 28
| December 25
| @ Oklahoma City
| 
| Chauncey Billups (30)
| Nenê (12)
| Ty Lawson (5)
| Oklahoma City Arena18,203
| 16–12
|- bgcolor="#ffcccc"
| 29
| December 26
| Philadelphia
| 
| Chauncey Billups (24)
| Chris Andersen,J. R. Smith (11)
| Chauncey Billups,Ty Lawson (4)
| Pepsi Center19,155
| 16–13
|- bgcolor="#ccffcc"
| 30
| December 28
| Portland
| 
| Chauncey Billups (18)
| Chris Andersen (11)
| Chauncey Billups (9)
| Pepsi Center17,388
| 17–13
|- bgcolor="#ccffcc"
| 31
| December 29
| @ Minnesota
| 
| Chauncey Billups (36)
| Chris Andersen (7)
| Chauncey Billups,Ty Lawson,J. R. Smith (5)
| Target Center17,093
| 18–13
|-

|- bgcolor="#ccffcc"
| 32
| January 1
| Sacramento
| 
| Chauncey Billups (22)
| Nenê (14)
| Chauncey Billups (5)
| Pepsi Center17,466
| 19–13
|- bgcolor="#ccffcc"
| 33
| January 3
| Houston
| 
| Carmelo Anthony (33)
| Carmelo Anthony,Nenê (11)
| Carmelo Anthony (5)
| Pepsi Center17,136
| 20–13
|- bgcolor="#ffcccc"
| 34
| January 5
| @ L.A. Clippers
| 
| Carmelo Anthony (31)
| Carmelo Anthony,Nenê (9)
| J. R. Smith (4)
| Staples Center17,540
| 20–14
|- bgcolor="#ffcccc"
| 35
| January 6
| @ Sacramento
| 
| Carmelo Anthony (26)
| Nenê (8)
| Ty Lawson,Nenê (3)
| ARCO Arena13,184
| 20–15
|- bgcolor="#ffcccc"
| 36
| January 9
| New Orleans
| 
| Al Harrington (20)
| Al Harrington (7)
| Carmelo Anthony,J. R. Smith (4)
| Pepsi Center16,283
| 20–16
|- bgcolor="#ccffcc"
| 37
| January 11
| Phoenix
| 
| Arron Afflalo (31)
| Carmelo Anthony (10)
| Chauncey Billups (7)
| Pepsi Center14,874
| 21–16
|- bgcolor="#ccffcc"
| 38
| January 13
| Miami
| 
| J. R. Smith (28)
| Nenê (9)
| Chauncey Billups (13)
| Pepsi Center19,155
| 22–16
|- bgcolor="#ccffcc"
| 39
| January 15
| Cleveland
| 
| Nenê (22)
| Shelden Williams (11)
| Chauncey Billups (8)
| Pepsi Center17,668
| 23–16
|- bgcolor="#ffcccc"
| 40
| January 16
| @ San Antonio
| 
| Al Harrington (18)
| Nenê (7)
| Chauncey Billups,Nenê,J. R. Smith (4)
| AT&T Center18,581
| 23–17
|- bgcolor="#ccffcc"
| 41
| January 19
| Oklahoma City
| 
| Carmelo Anthony (35)
| Kenyon Martin (11)
| Chauncey Billups (6)
| Pepsi Center16,872
| 24–17
|- bgcolor="#ffcccc"
| 42
| January 21
| L.A. Lakers
| 
| Carmelo Anthony (23)
| Nenê (7)
| Carmelo Anthony (5)
| Pepsi Center19,155
| 24–18
|- bgcolor="#ccffcc"
| 43
| January 23
| Indiana
| 
| Carmelo Anthony (36)
| Nenê (10)
| Chauncey Billups (6)
| Pepsi Center17,047
| 25–18
|- bgcolor="#ccffcc"
| 44
| January 25
| @ Washington
| 
| Carmelo Anthony (23)
| Nenê (9)
| Chauncey Billups (6)
| Verizon Center16,121
| 26–18
|- bgcolor="#ccffcc"
| 45
| January 26
| @ Detroit
| 
| Chauncey Billups (26)
| Carmelo Anthony (10)
| Carmelo Anthony (7)
| The Palace of Auburn Hills16,212
| 27–18
|- bgcolor="#ccffcc"
| 46
| January 28
| @ Cleveland
| 
| Carmelo Anthony (33)
| Kenyon Martin (9)
| Carmelo Anthony,Ty Lawson (5)
| Quicken Loans Arena19,642
| 28–18
|- bgcolor="#ffcccc"
| 47
| January 30
| @ Philadelphia
| 
| Chauncey Billups (27)
| J. R. Smith (9)
| Chauncey Billups (5)
| Wells Fargo Center15,612
| 28–19
|- bgcolor="#ffcccc"
| 48
| January 31
| @ New Jersey
| 
| Carmelo Anthony (37)
| Carmelo Anthony (9)
| Chauncey Billups (5)
| Prudential Center14,039
| 28–20
|-

|- bgcolor="#ccffcc"
| 49
| February 2
| Portland
| 
| Nenê (22)
| Nenê (10)
| Chauncey Billups (5)
| Pepsi Center15,258
| 29–20
|- bgcolor="#ffcccc"
| 50
| February 4
| Utah
| 
| Carmelo Anthony (31)
| Arron Afflalo (10)
| Chauncey Billups (5)
| Pepsi Center19,155
| 29–21
|- bgcolor="#ccffcc"
| 51
| February 5
| @ Minnesota
| 
| Carmelo Anthony (25)
| Al Harrington,J. R. Smith (7)
| Chauncey Billups (13)
| Target Center15,389
| 30–21
|- bgcolor="#ffcccc"
| 52
| February 7
| Houston
| 
| Carmelo Anthony (50)
| Carmelo Anthony (11)
| Ty Lawson (5)
| Pepsi Center14,595
| 30–22
|- bgcolor="#ffcccc"
| 53
| February 9
| @ Golden State
| 
| Carmelo Anthony (29)
| Al Harrington (8)
| Ty Lawson,J. R. Smith (6)
| Oracle Arena18,430
| 30–23
|- bgcolor="#ccffcc"
| 54
| February 10
| Dallas
| 
| Carmelo Anthony (42)
| Carmelo Anthony,Nenê (7)
| Chauncey Billups (9)
| Pepsi Center16,273
| 31–23
|- bgcolor="#ffcccc"
| 55
| February 13
| @ Memphis
| 
| Carmelo Anthony (31)
| Carmelo Anthony,Chris Andersen,Kenyon Martin (5)
| Chauncey Billups (7)
| FedExForum15,398
| 31–24
|- bgcolor="#ffcccc"
| 56
| February 14
| @ Houston
| 
| Arron Afflalo (17)
| Nenê (9)
| Carmelo Anthony,Chauncey Billups (3)
| Toyota Center16,450
| 31–25
|- bgcolor="#ccffcc"
| 57
| February 16
| @ Milwaukee
| 
| Carmelo Anthony (38)
| Carmelo Anthony (12)
| Kenyon Martin (7)
| Bradley Center16,033
| 32–25
|- align="center"
|colspan="9" bgcolor="#bbcaff"|All-Star Break
|- bgcolor="#ccffcc"
| 58
| February 22
| Memphis
| 
| J. R. Smith (26)
| J. R. Smith (8)
| Ty Lawson (7)
| Pepsi Center14,638
| 33–25
|- bgcolor="#ccffcc"
| 59
| February 24
| Boston
| 
| Kenyon Martin (18)
| Kenyon Martin,Nenê (10)
| Ty Lawson (10)
| Pepsi Center18,524
| 34–25
|- bgcolor="#ffcccc"
| 60
| February 25
| @ Portland
| 
| Danilo Gallinari (30)
| Nenê (11)
| Raymond Felton,Ty Lawson (6)
| Rose Garden20,659
| 34–26
|- bgcolor="#ccffcc"
| 61
| February 28
| Atlanta
| 
| J. R. Smith (19)
| Kenyon Martin (11)
| Raymond Felton (7)
| Pepsi Center16,163
| 35–26
|-

|- bgcolor="#ccffcc"
| 62
| March 2
| Charlotte
| 
| Wilson Chandler (16)
| Kenyon Martin,Nenê (8)
| Ty Lawson (10)
| Pepsi Center14,255
| 36–26
|- bgcolor="#ccffcc"
| 63
| March 3
| @ Utah
| 
| Ty Lawson (22)
| Kenyon Martin,Nenê (8)
| Raymond Felton,Ty Lawson (5)
| EnergySolutions Arena19,524
| 37–26
|- bgcolor="#ffcccc"
| 64
| March 5
| @ L.A. Clippers
| 
| Nenê (25)
| Nenê (14)
| Ty Lawson (8)
| Staples Center19,060
| 37–27
|- bgcolor="#ccffcc"
| 65
| March 10
| @ Phoenix
| 
| Nenê (22)
| Gary Forbes (9)
| Ty Lawson (11)
| US Airways Center17,465
| 38–27
|- bgcolor="#ccffcc"
| 66
| March 12
| Detroit
| 
| J. R. Smith (31)
| Nenê (11)
| Ty Lawson (11)
| Pepsi Center19,155
| 39–27
|- bgcolor="#ccffcc"
| 67
| March 14
| @ New Orleans
| 
| Ty Lawson (23)
| Nenê (13)
| Raymond Felton (12)
| New Orleans Arena11,782
| 40–27
|- bgcolor="#ccffcc"
| 68
| March 16
| @ Atlanta
| 
| Nenê (20)
| Wilson Chandler (10)
| Ty Lawson (10)
| Philips Arena14,669
| 41–27
|- bgcolor="#ffcccc"
| 69
| March 18
| @ Orlando
| 
| Wilson Chandler (20)
| Kenyon Martin (10)
| Raymond Felton (7)
| Amway Center19,113
| 41–28
|- bgcolor="#ffcccc"
| 70
| March 19
| @ Miami
| 
| J. R. Smith (27)
| Kenyon Martin (8)
| Ty Lawson (6)
| American Airlines Arena19,600
| 41–29
|- bgcolor="#ccffcc"
| 71
| March 21
| Toronto
| 
| Ty Lawson (23)
| J. R. Smith (10)
| Ty Lawson,J. R. Smith (8)
| Pepsi Center16,258
| 42–29
|- bgcolor="#ccffcc"
| 72
| March 23
| San Antonio
| 
| Al Harrington (27)
| Nenê (10)
| Raymond Felton (8)
| Pepsi Center19,155
| 43–29
|- bgcolor="#ccffcc"
| 73
| March 25
| Washington
| 
| Chris Andersen,Danilo Gallinari,Al Harrington,Ty Lawson (17)
| Chris Andersen (11)
| Raymond Felton (8)
| Pepsi Center19,308
| 44–29
|- bgcolor="#ccffcc"
| 74
| March 30
| Sacramento
| 
| Ty Lawson (20)
| Nenê (15)
| Raymond Felton (7)
| Pepsi Center17,955
| 45–29
|-

|- bgcolor="#ccffcc"
| 75
| April 1
| @ Sacramento
| 
| Raymond Felton (17)
| Nenê (12)
| Nenê (6)
| Power Balance Pavilion15,871
| 46–29
|- bgcolor="#ccffcc"
| 76
| April 3
| @ L.A. Lakers
| 
| Danilo Gallinari (22)
| Kenyon Martin (8)
| Ty Lawson (8)
| Staples Center18,997
| 47–29
|- bgcolor="#ffcccc"
| 77
| April 5
| Oklahoma City
| 
| Ty Lawson (28)
| Nenê (8)
| Ty Lawson (5)
| Pepsi Center18,203
| 47–30
|- bgcolor="#ccffcc"
| 78
| April 6
| @ Dallas
| 
| J. R. Smith (23)
| Nenê (15)
| Ty Lawson (8)
| American Airlines Center20,364
| 48–30
|- bgcolor="#ffcccc"
| 79
| April 8
| @ Oklahoma City
| 
| Nenê (18)
| Kenyon Martin (13)
| Ty Lawson (6)
| Oklahoma City Arena18,203
| 48–31
|- bgcolor="#ccffcc"
| 80
| April 9
| Minnesota
| 
| Ty Lawson (37)
| Kenyon Martin,J. R. Smith (8)
| Raymond Felton (14)
| Pepsi Center19,155
| 49–31
|- bgcolor="#ccffcc"
| 81
| April 11
| Golden State
| 
| J. R. Smith (22)
| Chris Andersen (12)
| Raymond Felton (10)
| Pepsi Center19,155
| 50–31
|- bgcolor="#ffcccc"
| 82
| April 13
| @ Utah
| 
| Wilson Chandler (27)
| Chris Andersen (10)
| Wilson Chandler,Gary Forbes,Al Harrington,Ty Lawson,J. R. Smith (3)
| EnergySolutions Arena19,051
| 50–32
|-

Playoffs

Game log

|- bgcolor=ffcccc
| 1
| April 17
| @ Oklahoma City
| 
| Nenê (22)
| Wilson Chandler,Nenê (8)
| Raymond Felton (8)
| Oklahoma City Arena18,203
| 0–1
|- bgcolor=ffcccc
| 2
| April 20
| @ Oklahoma City
| 
| Ty Lawson (20)
| Nenê (9)
| Ty Lawson (3)
| Oklahoma City Arena18,203
| 0–2
|- bgcolor=ffcccc
| 3
| April 23
| Oklahoma City
| 
| Kenyon Martin,Nenê,J. R. Smith (15)
| Nenê (10)
| Raymond Felton,Ty Lawson,Nenê (4)
| Pepsi Center19,958
| 0–3
|- bgcolor=ccffcc
| 4
| April 25
| Oklahoma City
| 
| Ty Lawson (27)
| Kenyon Martin,Nenê (9)
| Danilo Gallinari (4)
| Pepsi Center19,155
| 1–3
|- bgcolor=ffcccc
| 5
| April 27
| @ Oklahoma City
| 
| Arron Afflalo (15)
| Kenyon Martin (10)
| Raymond Felton,Ty Lawson (4)
| Oklahoma City Arena18,203
| 1–4
|-

Player statistics

Season

†Denotes player spent time with another team before joining Nuggets. Stats reflect time with Nuggets only.
‡Traded mid-season. Stats reflect time with Nuggets only.

Playoffs

Awards, records and milestones

Awards

Week/Month

All-Star
Carmelo Anthony represented the Nuggets at the 2011 NBA All-Star Game as a starter for the Western Conference. The All-Star game would end up being the last time 'Melo represented the Nuggets as he was traded the next day to the New York Knicks.

Season

Records

Milestones
 December 10: Seventh coach in history to 1,000 wins.  Head coach George Karl became the seventh head coach in NBA history to win 1,000 games in the Nuggets' 123–116 road victory over the Toronto Raptors.

Transactions

Trades

Free agents

Additions

Subtractions

References

Denver Nuggets seasons
Denver
Denver Nuggets
Denver Nuggets